Finding Bliss is a 2009 romantic comedy film written and directed by filmmaker Julie Davis (Amy's Orgasm). Finding Bliss explores the pornographic film industry through the eyes of an idealistic 24-year-old film school grad, Jody Balaban (played by Leelee Sobieski).

Plot
 
After a long humbling year temping as a traffic cop on a studio lot, Jody is faced with the hard decision of taking the only well-paying industry job she has yet been offered — editing porn at Grind Productions, a profitable adult film company run by former porn star Irene Fox (Kristen Johnston).

At first horrified by the prospect of exposing herself to the cockroaches of the film industry, not to mention the effect it would have on her strict Jewish parents, Jody has a remarkable change of heart when she realizes that Grind has all the facilities she needs to make her own low budget movie — on the sly of course — but things get complicated when Jody meets Jeff Drake (Matthew Davis), the charming Herr Director of adult films. Jeff, also an award-winning filmmaker, once had his own dreams of making "real" films, but now is a hard-worn cynic who masks his disappointment behind a façade of irony.  In Jody, he sees the idealism he once had, while Jody starts to face her own sexual hang-ups as she begins to get aroused by the porn she so harshly judges. Jody and Jeff get close to each other, but she gets hurt when she sees him making out with one of his actresses, Sindi, who was actually taking advantage of Jeff in his drunken state. The movie made by Jody is well received by critics, and Jeff is also nominated for an AVN Award for his movie. Jody wants to set things right with him; she accepts help from Bliss, the lead actress in both Jody's and Jeff's movies, but with different identities, and pretends to be her to gain entry at an award function. On stage, when Jeff receives his award, he announces his retirement from the Adult Industry to move on. Jeff calls Bliss for special thanks. He realizes that Jody is in disguise as Bliss, and they kiss.

Cast
 Leelee Sobieski as Jody Balaban
 Matthew Davis as Jeff Drake
 Denise Richards as Laura/Bliss
 Mircea Monroe as Sindi
 Jamie Kennedy as Richard 'Dick' Harder
 Kristen Johnston as Irene
 P. J. Byrne as Gary
 Caroline Aaron as Debra Balaban
 Tim Bagley as Alan Balaban
 Christa Campbell as Kato
 Mr. Marcus as Jake B. Bigg
 Sammi Hanratty as Young Jody Balaban
 Donnamarie Recco as Kathleen
 Stormy Daniels as a porn starlet
 Garry Marshall as Himself
 Ron Jeremy as Himself
 Zach Cumer as Bobby Daples
 Mario Cassem as Morris Goldstein
 Dan Taylor as Cute Guy
 Julie Davis as Dyan Cannons
 G.K. Bowes as Additional voices (uncredited)

Release
The film was released theatrically in the U.S. on June 4, 2010 in New York City and June 11, 2010 in Los Angeles.

Reception
The film was well-received upon its premiere at the 2009 Slamdance Film Festival.

The film opened the 2009 Gen Art Film Festival in New York.

References

External links
 
 
 
 
 Finding Bliss at Metacritic
 
 

2009 films
2000s English-language films
2009 romantic comedy films
Films about pornography
Films scored by John Swihart
American romantic comedy films
2000s American films